John Bernard, Count of Lippe (18 October 1613 - 10 June 1652) was a ruling Count of Lippe-Detmold from 1650 until his death.

He was the second eldest son of Count Simon VII of Lippe and his wife Anne Catherine of Nassau-Wiesbaden-Idstein (1590-1622).  After the death of his nephew Simon Philip in 1650, he inherited Lippe-Detmold.

He died childless in 1652.  His younger brother Herman Adolph inherited Lippe-Detmold.

Counts of Lippe
House of Lippe
1613 births
1652 deaths
17th-century German people